In mathematics compact convergence (or uniform convergence on compact sets) is a type of convergence that generalizes the idea of uniform convergence.  It is associated with the compact-open topology.

Definition
Let  be a topological space and  be a metric space. A sequence of functions

, 

This means that  for all compact ,

Examples
 A  very powerful tool for showing compact convergence is the Arzelà–Ascoli theorem. There are several versions of this theorem, roughly speaking it states that every sequence of equicontinuous and uniformly bounded maps has a subsequence that converges compactly to some continuous map.

Properties
 If  uniformly, then  compactly.
 If  is a compact space and  compactly, then  uniformly.
 If  is a locally compact space, then  compactly if and only if  locally uniformly.
 If  is a compactly generated space,  compactly, and each  is continuous, then  is continuous.

See also
Modes of convergence (annotated index)
Montel's theorem

References
R. Remmert Theory of complex functions (1991 Springer) p. 95

Functional analysis
Convergence (mathematics)
Topology of function spaces
Topological spaces